Auburn Mountainview High School is located in Lea Hill on the east hill of Auburn, a city in King County, Washington, United States. It was named after the scenic views from the school, including the Cascade Mountains, Mount Rainier, and the Olympic Mountains.

History
Construction of Auburn Mountainview began in 2004 in the Lea Hill area of Auburn, Washington. The school was built to relieve overcrowding of the district's other two main high schools, Auburn Senior High School and Auburn Riverside High School. Mountainview opened its doors to the community in the fall of 2005. Nearby Rainier Middle School is the primary feeder school with a small number from Cascade Middle School as well as some Kent area students. The school is close to the Auburn-Kent border. Because of perennial troubles with overcrowding in many Kent schools, about 40% of the Auburn Mountainview student population is made up of Kent area students.

Athletics
Auburn Mountainview's sports teams are called the Lions and compete in the Olympic Division of the North Puget Sound League since 2016.

Notable alumni
Ariana Kukors, American swimmer 200m IM world record holder

References

External links 
 

High schools in King County, Washington
Buildings and structures in Auburn, Washington
Educational institutions established in 2005
Public high schools in Washington (state)
2005 establishments in Washington (state)